Defending champion Diede de Groot defeated Aniek van Koot in the final, 6–3, 6–2 to win the ladies' singles wheelchair tennis title at the 2018 Wimbledon Championships. It was her first step towards a non-calendar-year Grand Slam.

Seeds

  Diede de Groot (champion)
  Yui Kamiji (semifinals)

Draw

Finals

References
WC Women's Singles

Women's Wheelchair Singles
Wimbledon Championship by year – Wheelchair women's singles